The Paul Erdős Prize (formerly Mathematical Prize) is given to Hungarian mathematicians not older than 40 by the Mathematics Department of the Hungarian Academy of Sciences. It was established and originally funded by Paul Erdős.

Awardees

See also

 List of mathematics awards

Sources
The list on the homepage of the Hungarian academy

Paul Erdős
Mathematics awards
Hungarian awards
Awards established in 1973